Tye Warner Bietz (born February 5, 1984 in Calgary, Alberta, Canada) is a Canadian trap shooter.  He is best known for his silver medal win at the 2006 Commonwealth Games in Men's Trap Pairs.  Bietz teamed up with fellow Canadian Kirk Reynolds to shoot 185, 4 points behind the gold medal winning Australians.

References

1984 births
Living people
Trap and double trap shooters
Canadian male sport shooters
Commonwealth Games medallists in shooting
Commonwealth Games silver medallists for Canada
Shooters at the 2006 Commonwealth Games
Medallists at the 2006 Commonwealth Games